Daniela Holt Voith is an American architect. She founded Philadelphia-based architecture studio Voith & Mactavish Architects, LLP and is Fellow of the American Institute of Architects (FAIA). She has worked extensively providing planning and design services with schools and universities including the University of Pennsylvania Carey Law School, Yale University, and boarding schools such as  Millbrook School, The Lawrenceville School, and St. Andrew’s School, where the film Dead Poets Society was shot. The firm's major projects also include preserving, rehabilitating, and additions to National Historic Landmarks such as the Mercer Museum, Bryn Mawr Film Institute, Old Library at Bryn Mawr College, and the former Centennial National Bank, now the alumni center for Drexel University. She is married to economist Richard Patrick Voith, Chairman of Econsultsolutions Inc., who is a fellow at the University of Pennsylvania's Institute of Urban Research and adjunct faculty at Wharton.

Early years 
Voith was born in Philadelphia in 1954 to Tatiana Holt and Anatol Holt. Her mother was a chemist while her father was a linguist and mathematician who contributed to the development of generalized programming. Her paternal grandmother was anthropologist and art historian Claire Holt.

Voith earned a Bachelor of Arts from Bryn Mawr College in 1976 and a Master of Architecture from Yale University School of Architecture in 1981. She served as the basketball captain of Yale's Architects League for three years, where she was the only female member.

Early role models were her grandmother, Claire Holt, architect Anne Tyng, and Barbara Miller Lane. Later she studied with Charles Moore, Caesar Pelli and Marc Simon, all of whom had an effect on her philosophical and design position in her career.

Career 
From 1985 to 1988, she was principal at Atkin, Voith & Associates alongside Tony Atkin. The firm won acclaim for the Chapel for the Cathedral of Christ the King in Hamilton, Ontario, which was awarded a Progressive Architecture award in 1983, as well as the Renfrew Center which was cited in Progressive Architecture in 1985. Other notable projects included a shortlisted masterplan for the Brooklyn Museum and exhibition design for Red Grooms at the Pennsylvania Academy of Fine Arts.

In 1988, she founded Voith & Mactavish Architects, LLP with Cameron Mactavish. Her primary focus at VMA, which was cited in her FAIA recognition, has been the planning and design of educational institutions. She is currently the practice's Founding Partner and Director of Design.

Voith has been a faculty member at Bryn Mawr College since 1983, and is currently a senior lecturer in their Growth and Structure of Cities program. She has also taught at Yale University, Drexel University, and the University of Pennsylvania.

Notable projects 

 Lehigh College of Business Building, Lehigh University, Bethlehem, PA
 Dwight Hall Renovation, Yale University, New Haven, CT.
 Carey Law School Renovation, University of Pennsylvania, Philadelphia, PA. Original design of Silverman Hall by Cope and Stewardson.
 Lebow College of Business, Drexel University, Philadelphia, PA.
 Noyes Hall Restoration, Vassar College, Poughkeepsie, NY. Original design by Eero Saarinen.
 Renovation of the Old Library at Bryn Mawr College, Bryn Mawr, Pennsylvania. Original design by Cope and Stewardson.
 Christ Church Neighborhood House, Philadelphia, PA.
 Mercer Museum Addition, Doylestown, PA.
 Church Farm School Modernization, Chester County, PA.
 Renovation of Abbott Dining Hall at Lawrenceville School, Mercer County, NJ.

Recognition and appointments 
Voith has received multiple awards and honors for her achievements in and contributions to the advancement of architecture, some of which include:

In 1994, she served as President of American Institute of Architects' Philadelphia Chapter.

In 2008, she was appointed to Philadelphia’s Zoning Code Commission by Mayor Michael Nutter.

In 2014, she was named a Fellow of the American Institute of Architects.

In 2014, her firm was the subject of a retrospective at Haverford College.

In 2019, she was appointed to the board of the Philadelphia Chapter of the Institute for Classical Architecture and Art where she currently serves as President.

References 

American women architects
21st-century American women
Bryn Mawr College alumni
Bryn Mawr College faculty
Yale School of Architecture alumni
Living people
Year of birth missing (living people)
New Classical architects